Monirul may refer to:

Monirul Haq Chowdhury, Bangladesh Nationalist Party politician and MP
Kazi Monirul Huda, Bangladeshi politician, lawyer and MP
Mohammad Monirul Islam, Bangladesh Awami League politician and MP
Monirul Islam (artist) (born 1943), Bangladeshi-Spanish artist
Monirul Islam (Khulna cricketer), first-class and List A cricketer from Bangladesh
Monirul Islam (police officer) (born 1970), Additional Inspector General of Police of Bangladesh Police
Sheikh Md Monirul Islam, retired Major General of Bangladesh Army
Kazi Monirul Islam Manu, Bangladesh Awami League politician and MP
Monirul Mondal (born 1986), Indian professional footballer
Monirul Haque Sakku, Bangladeshi politician and mayor
Monirul Islam Tipu Politician of Narail District of Bangladesh and MP